The flag of the governor general of Canada is a flag used as a symbol to mark the presence of the governor general of Canada. Such a flag has been used by governors general since just after Canadian Confederation and the design has altered over decades. The current flag was adopted in 1981.

Design
The first governor general's flag was adopted in 1870 and followed the design of other viceregal flags in use throughout the British Empire at the time: a Union Flag defaced with the shield of the coat of arms of Canada; though, in contrast to other imperial governors, the wreath surrounding the central badge was one of maple instead of laurel leaves. The design was updated in 1921, to incorporate changes to the appearance of Canada's coat of arms, and again in 1931, to reflect developments in Canada's constitutional structure brought about by the Statute of Westminster, whereby the governor general became the personal representative of the monarch of Canada, rather than a representative of the British monarch in Canada, as it was previously.

The current flag was first introduced in 1981 and comprises the crest of the royal coat of arms of Canada—a crowned lion holding a red maple leaf in its paw, standing on a wreath of red and white (Canada's official colours)—on a blue background. This design differs from that of the flags of governors-general in the other Commonwealth realms; most feature the royal crest of the arms of the United Kingdom above a scroll bearing the relevant country's name; the flag of the governor-general of New Zealand displays the crowned shield of the coat of arms of New Zealand on a blue field.

While Roméo LeBlanc served as governor general (1995-1999), the flag was, at LeBlanc's direction, modified: the lion's tongue and claws were removed, which made the animal appear, in LeBlanc's opinion, more "Canadian". These changes were reversed in 2002.

Use

The flag is flown from the governor general's official residences—Rideau Hall and La Citadelle—and any other building the governor general is visiting. It may also be flown from any vehicle being used by the governor general. On overseas visits, the national flag is used to identify the governor general.

The flag takes precedence over the National Flag and the personal standards of any member of the royal family other than the sovereign, but not ahead of the royal standard or the flag of a lieutenant governor of a province at a function hosted by that lieutenant governor.

Legal
The flag is protected under the Trade-marks Act; Section 9(c) states:

Historical versions

See also

 Canadian royal symbols
 Flags of the lieutenant governors of Canada
 List of Canadian flags
 National symbols of Canada

References

External links
 Governor General's Flag – Governor General's official website
 Public Register of Arms, Flags and Badges: Governor General of Canada
 Head of State, The Flags of Canada, by Alistair B. Fraser

Governor General
Flags displaying animals